The discography of Chayanne includes 15 studio albums, 5 compilation albums and 2 live albums. Puerto Rican Latin pop singer Chayanne's albums have sold over 30 million albums worldwide. 5 of his albums have charted on the Billboard 200 chart and he has had 5 number 1 albums on the US Latin Billboard charts. Many of his albums have been certified platinum with Atado a Tu Amor being certified 5× platinum in Argentina for selling over 500,000 copies. The album was also certified gold in the United States. In addition to the albums, Chayanne has released 60 singles and 58 music videos. Throughout his career, Chayanne has been signed to record labels, Sony Music and RCA Records.

Albums

Studio albums

Live albums

Compilation albums

Singles

Music videos

Other songs and duets

"Una Luna Para Dos" from the original edition of the album "Chayanne" (1987).
"Não Posso Mais Viver Assim". Appears in the Portuguese language version of "Chayanne" (1987).
"Pata Pata" (duet with Miriam Makeba) from the album "Chayanne" (1988).
"Danza Sara" from the film Linda Sara.
"Jingle Bell Rock". Appears in Navidad en las Américas (1994).
"Hey Jude" (with various artists) & "Michelle". Appears in Hey Jude: Tributo a los Beatles.
"Toque de Magia" (duet with Angelica). Appears in Angelica.
"You Are My Home" & "Refugio de Amor" (duet with Vanessa Williams). Appears in Dance with Me original soundtrack.
"La Múcura/La Cocaleca. Appears in "Siempre Piel Canela" from "Banco Popular de PR".
"Caminando Caminando" (duet with Anna Oxa). Appears in Senza Pieta.
"Cuando un Amor Se Va" (duet with Rubén Blades) & "Dame (Touch Me)" (duet with Jennifer Lopez) from the album Simplemente.
"Donde Va Tu Sueño (Where the Dream Takes You)" from the Atlantis: The Lost Empire soundtrack.
"Veo En Ti La Luz" (duet with Danna Paola) from the soundtrack to the Spanish-language version of the film Tangled.
"Amor Inmortal" from the telenovela Gabriel.
"Me Enamoré De Ti" from the 2009 telenovela Corazon Salvaje.
Tu respiracion from the 2015 telenovela Lo imperdonable.
"Amorcito Corazón" from the telenovela Amorcito Corazón (original song of Pedro Infante).
"The Best Is Yet To Come" (duet with Tony Bennett) from the latter's Viva Duets.

References

Discographies of Puerto Rican artists
Latin pop music discographies